Charles Payson (May 2, 1837 – July 11, 1913), of Massachusetts, was a United States diplomat.  He served as United States Third Assistant Secretary of State from June 22, 1878 to June 30, 1881.

Payson was born in Messina, Sicily on May 2, 1837.

In 1881, United States Secretary of State James G. Blaine removed Payson from office so that his son, Walker Blaine, could become Third Secretary.  At that time, Payson became U.S. Chargé d'Affaires to Denmark, holding that office from August 12, 1881 to February 23, 1882.

After the ending of Payson's diplomatic duties in 1882, the Paysons lived mainly in Europe. His remains were transported to Vevey, Switzerland, where he was buried.

Payson's wife Fanny was the daughter of Governor of Wisconsin Cadwallader C. Washburn.

References

1837 births
1913 deaths
United States Assistant Secretaries of State
Ambassadors of the United States to Denmark
19th-century American diplomats